Kiyomi Ito (born 30 October 1949) is a Japanese speed skater. He competed in three events at the 1972 Winter Olympics.

References

1949 births
Living people
Japanese male speed skaters
Olympic speed skaters of Japan
Speed skaters at the 1972 Winter Olympics
Sportspeople from Fukuoka Prefecture